Edward Chia Bing Hui (born 1984) is a Singaporean politician and businessman. A member of the governing People's Action Party (PAP), he has been the Member of Parliament (MP) representing the Zhenghua division of Holland–Bukit Timah GRC since 2020.

Chia was the co-founder of Timbre Group, but had stepped down from directorship in June 2021 and is no longer a shareholder. He has been serving as Managing Director of PlaceM and Director of Feed the World since. 

Chia has been known to support and develop Singaporean musicians and culinary talents since 2005.

Education
Chia attended National Junior College before graduating from the National University of Singapore in 2009 with a Bachelor of Arts degree in economics and political science.

Business career
While studying at National Junior College, Chia founded Arts For Us All (AFUA), a defunct non-profit organisation which engage youths in arts-based community work and events. 

Chia co-founded Timbre with Danny Loong in 2015, a few of months before starting on his undergraduate studies at the National University of Singapore. While studying in NUS, he was actively managing the business. 

Chia has been serving as a council member of the Ngee Ann Polytechnic, National Youth Achievement Award Council, a board member of SMU Enterprise and NP Enterprise Pte Ltd and the co-chair of the National Environment Agency (NEA) work group which focuses on sustaining the hawker trade.

Political career
Chia was fielded in the 2020 general election to contest in Holland–Bukit Timah GRC on the People's Action Party's ticket against the Singapore Democratic Party. Chia's running mates were Vivian Balakrishnan, Sim Ann, and Christopher de Souza. On 11 July 2020, Chia and the PAP team were declared elected Members of Parliament representing Holland–Bukit Timah GRC in the 14th Parliament after garnering 66.36% of the valid votes.

Chia was then appointed as the Deputy Chairperson of Manpower Government Parliamentary Committee (GPC) in the 14th Parliament. He also sat on the Finance and Trade and Industry GPC.

Since his appointment as a Member of Parliament for Holland-Bukit Timah GRC, Chia had spoken up several times in Parliament, such as the need for businesses to find ways to be sustainable and expand to provide more jobs for Singaporeans. He emphasised the importance of helping companies upskill their employers and helping businesses grow their business.

In the Zhenghua ward, Chia worked with Vivian Balakrishnan and Liang Eng Hwa to launch a Bukit Panjang Town Jobs and Skills Support Taskforce which supplemented national efforts to help job seekers secure employment. Also, he reached out to Food Bank Singapore to install vending machines to ease food insecurity for households and seniors who live in rental blocks or one-to two-room studio apartments.

Personal life 
Chia is the eldest of three children born to a businessman and a home-maker. He is married, and has a son.

Awards 
2010: Chia, together with Timbre's other co-founder Danny Loong, was conferred the Tourism Entrepreneur of the Year award under the Singapore Tourism Board’s Singapore Experience Awards.

2011: NUS Outstanding Young Alumni

2014:

 Singapore Youth Award 
 Junior Chamber International (JCI) Singapore, Ten Outstanding Young Persons of the World - Business, Economic and/or Entrepreneurial Accomplishment

2016: ASEAN Youth Award

References

External links
 Edward Chia on Parliament of Singapore

People's Action Party politicians
Living people
1984 births
National University of Singapore alumni
Members of the Parliament of Singapore